Richard Paul Capstick (born 13 February 2000) is an English rugby union backrow for Exeter Chiefs in Premiership Rugby.

Career
Capstick began playing rugby in his native Somerset for Taunton and local school Heathfield Community School.  He joined Exeter Chiefs academy at 14 and played for England's under 18s at 16.  He made his debut for Exeter's first team as an 18-year-old, against Bath in the 2018-19 Premiership Rugby Cup. He became Exeter Chiefs youngest ever try scorer when he scored his first Premiership try at the age of 19. He was the first Premiership forward born in the 21st century.

References

2000 births
Living people
English rugby union players
Exeter Chiefs players
Rugby union flankers
Rugby union players from Taunton